Ojukheon in Gangneung, Gangwon Province, South Korea, is where the most prominent Korean Confucian scholar of the Joseon Dynasty Yi I (whose image is on the South Korean 5,000 won note) and his mother Shin Saimdang (whose image is on the 50,000 won note) were born. The background of the South Korean 5,000 won note is Ojukheon.

Meaning 
The meaning of the Ojukheon is the place where there is much black bamboo.

Buildings 
The following buildings are parts of the Ojukheon complex:
 The Ojukheon house itself, with Mongnyongsil 몽룡실(夢龍室) : the room where Yi I was born. Ojukheon is one of the oldest remaining Korean wooden buildings and has been nominated Korean National Cultural Heritage No. 165.
 Munseongsa Shrine 문성사(文成祠), the place where the Portrait of Yi I is and Munseong is another nickname of Yi I. There are also the inkstone which Yi I used and Gyeongmongyogyeol (the book which Yi I wrote)
 Eojegak (어제각, 御製閣)
 Yulgok Memorial Hall (율곡기념관)
 Gangneung City Museum (강릉시립박물관)

References 

Buildings and structures in Gangneung